Anna York Cristina Puyat Bondoc-Sagum (born May 11, 1967) is a Filipino pulmonologist and politician currently serving as a member of the House of Representatives of the Philippines representing Pampanga's 4th congressional district since June 30, 2022. She previously held the position from 2004 to 2013.

Career
In 2005, Bondoc was vice chairperson of the House Committee on Health, and in 2011, was vice chairperson of the House Committee on Appropriations.

In June 2012, Representative Bondoc sponsored an amendment to the Expanded Breastfeeding Promotion Act of 2009. The proposed amendment revises the provisions rendering a time for breastfeeding babies during work hours. Breastfeeding mothers would no longer be paid for time spent breastfeeding, as they are under the current Milk Code, provided the breaks do not exceed 40 minutes during an eight-hour work period.

References

|-

Living people
Members of the House of Representatives of the Philippines from Pampanga
Nacionalista Party politicians
People from Pampanga
1967 births